The 62d Fighter Wing (62 FW) is a disbanded unit of the United States Air Force, last stationed at Van Nuys Airport, Van Nuys, California. It was withdrawn from the California Air National Guard (CA ANG) and inactivated on 31 October 1950.

This wing is not related to the 62d Troop Carrier Wing or subsequent units that was constituted on 28 July 1947 and activated on 15 August 1947.

History

World War II
Formed at Mitchel Field, New York in December 1942. Departed New York 13 January 1943 via New York Port of Embarkation. Arrived Casablanca, French Morocco on 30 January 1943 and assigned to Twelfth Air Force. Primary mission was fighter escort; air defense using night fighter units; harbor protection; homing of lost aircraft and air-sea rescue.  Inactivated in Italy in September 1945.

Air National Guard
Allocated to the California Air National Guard for command and control origination for units in the Southwest Region (Southern California, Arizona) of the United States.  Extended federal recognition and activated on 14 September 1950.

At the end of October 1950, the Air National Guard converted to the wing-base Hobson Plan organization. As a result, the wing was withdrawn from the California ANG and was inactivated on 31 October 1950.  The 146th Composite Wing was established by the National Guard Bureau, allocated to the state of California, recognized and activated 1 November 1950; assuming the personnel, equipment and mission of the inactivated 62d Fighter Wing.

Lineage
 Constituted as 1st Air Defense Wing on 12 December 1942 and activated the same day.
 Redesignated 62d Fighter Wing in July 1943.
 Inactivated in Italy on 12 September 1945
 Allotted to the California ANG on 24 May 1946
 Extended federal recognition and activated on 14 September 1950
 Inactivated, and returned to the control of the Department of the Air Force, on 31 October 1950
 Disbanded on 15 June 1983

Assignments
 First Air Force, 12 December 1942 – 13 January 1943
 Twelfth Air Force, 30 January 1943 – 12 September 1945
 California Air National Guard, 14 September-31 October 1950

Components

World War II
 414th Night Fighter Squadron, 21 September 1944 – 1 April 1945
 415th Night Fighter Squadron, 20 June – 7 August 1943; 27 September 1943 – 5 August 1944
 416th Night Fighter Squadron, 28 January – 27 June 1944

California Air National Guard
 146th Fighter Group, 16 September 1946 – 31 October 1950
 115th Bombardment Squadron, 16 September 1946 – 31 October 1950

Stations
 Mitchel Field, New York, 12 December 1942 – 13 January 1943
 Casablanca Airfield, French Morocco, 30 January 1943
 Sousse Airfield, Tunisia, 14 May 1943
 Palermo Airfield, Sicily, 25 July 1943
 Naples, Italy, 20 October 1943
 Antignano, Italy, c. 15 September 1944
 Pomigliano Airfield, Italy, August-12 September 1945
 Van Nuys Airport, Van Nuys, California, 14 September-31 October 1950

References

 Maurer, Maurer. Air Force Combat Units of World War II. Maxwell AFB, Alabama: Office of Air Force History, 1983. .

062
062
0062
Military units and formations established in 1943
Military units and formations disestablished in 1950